The 2005-2006 NBA season was the Raptors' eleventh season in the National Basketball Association. In the 2005 offseason, the Raptors selected Charlie Villanueva and Joey Graham with the seventh and sixteenth pick, respectively, in the first found of the 2005 NBA Draft. After the draft, the Raptors signed an undrafted José Calderón as a free agent. The Raptors started the regular season 1-15, and the team struggled the remainder of the season, playing sub .500 basketball the remainder of the season. On January 26, 2006 the Raptors fired general manager Rob Babcock. Wayne Embry was named interim general manager, until the February 28, 2006 hiring of Phoenix Suns president and general manager Bryan Colangelo as the Raptors' new general manager. On February 3, 2006, the Raptors traded Jalen Rose, a first-round draft pick, and an undisclosed amount of cash to the New York Knicks in exchange for Antonio Davis, a move likely made to clear Jalen Rose's annual 16 million dollar salary from the team salary cap. Antonio Davis would play eight games for the Raptors before missing the next twelve games with a back injury. On March 23, 2006, the Raptors released Antonio Davis when team doctors diagnosed Davis' back injury as being season-ending.

The Raptors had the fifth best team offensive rating in the NBA.

NBA Draft

Roster

Regular season

Standings

Record vs. opponents

Game log

|- bgcolor="ffcccc"
| 1
| November 2
| Washington
| 
| Jalen Rose (20)
| Chris Bosh (14)
| Mike James (7)
| Air Canada Centre18,106
| 0–1
|- bgcolor="ffcccc"
| 2
| November 4
| New Jersey
| 
| José Calderón, Morris Peterson (20)
| Morris Peterson (8)
| José Calderón (7)
| Air Canada Centre18,586
| 0–2
|- bgcolor="ffcccc"
| 3
| November 5
| @ Detroit
| 
| Jalen Rose (25)
| Chris Bosh, Jalen Rose (7)
| José Calderón (10)
| The Palace of Auburn Hills22,076
| 0–3
|- bgcolor="ffcccc"
| 4
| November 7
| Cleveland
| 
| Chris Bosh (26)
| Chris Bosh (12)
| José Calderón (7)
| Air Canada Centre18,281
| 0–4
|- bgcolor="ffcccc"
| 5
| November 11
| Utah
| 
| Chris Bosh (19)
| Chris Bosh (10)
| José Calderón, Mike James (4)
| Air Canada Centre15,617
| 0–5
|- bgcolor="ffcccc"
| 6
| November 13
| Seattle
| 
| Mike James (36)
| Charlie Villanueva (12)
| José Calderón (12)
| Air Canada Centre15,033
| 0–6
|- bgcolor="ffcccc"
| 7
| November 15
| @ Philadelphia
| 
| Charlie Villanueva (27)
| Chris Bosh (17)
| Jalen Rose (5)
| Wachovia Center12,211
| 0–7
|- bgcolor="ffcccc"
| 8
| November 16
| Philadelphia
| 
| Mike James (38)
| Chris Bosh (10)
| Mike James (9)
| Air Canada Centre16,490
| 0–8
|- bgcolor="ffcccc"
| 9
| November 18
| @ Boston
| 
| Chris Bosh (24)
| Chris Bosh (14)
| Mike James (7)
| TD Banknorth Garden17,002
| 0–9
|- bgcolor="bbffbb"
| 10
| November 20
| Miami
| 
| Chris Bosh (27)
| Chris Bosh, Charlie Villanueva (12)
| José Calderón (9)
| Air Canada Centre17,594
| 1–9
|- bgcolor="ffcccc"
| 11
| November 22
| @ Phoenix
| 
| Chris Bosh (23)
| Chris Bosh, Charlie Villanueva (8)
| Mike James (6)
| America West Arena16,259
| 1–10
|- bgcolor="ffcccc"
| 12
| November 23
| @ L.A. Clippers
| 
| Chris Bosh (24)
| Chris Bosh (9)
| Mike James (8)
| Staples Center15,927
| 1–11
|- bgcolor="ffcccc"
| 13
| November 25
| @ Sacramento
| 
| Chris Bosh (22)
| Morris Peterson (9)
| José Calderón, Jalen Rose (6)
| ARCO Arena17,317
| 1–12
|- bgcolor="ffcccc"
| 14
| November 26
| @ Golden State
| 
| Chris Bosh, Morris Peterson (21)
| Morris Peterson (8)
| José Calderón (6)
| The Arena in Oakland17,119
| 1–13
|- bgcolor="ffcccc"
| 15
| November 28
| Dallas
| 
| Chris Bosh (26)
| Chris Bosh (10)
| José Calderón (8)
| Air Canada Centre15,789
| 1–14
|- bgcolor="ffcccc"
| 16
| November 30
| Memphis
| 
| Chris Bosh (15)
| Chris Bosh (8)
| José Calderón (7)
| Air Canada Centre14,993
| 1–15

|- bgcolor="bbffbb"
| 17
| December 2
| @ Atlanta
| 
| Chris Bosh (23)
| Charlie Villanueva (10)
| Mike James (7)
| Philips Arena12,261
| 2–15
|- bgcolor="bbffbb"
| 18
| December 3
| @ New Jersey
| 
| Chris Bosh (29)
| Chris Bosh (13)
| José Calderón (8)
| Continental Airlines Arena14,613
| 3–15
|- bgcolor="ffcccc"
| 19
| December 6
| @ Washington
| 
| Chris Bosh (27)
| Chris Bosh, José Calderón (9)
| José Calderón (13)
| MCI Center12,401
| 3–16
|- bgcolor="ffcccc"
| 20
| December 7
| L.A. Lakers
| 
| Chris Bosh (22)
| Chris Bosh (10)
| Chris Bosh (6)
| Air Canada Centre18,821
| 3–17
|- bgcolor="bbffbb"
| 21
| December 10
| @ Charlotte
| 
| Chris Bosh (30)
| Chris Bosh (11)
| Mike James (6)
| Charlotte Bobcats Arena15,163
| 4–17
|- bgcolor="ffcccc"
| 22
| December 14
| Chicago
| 
| Chris Bosh (25)
| Morris Peterson (7)
| José Calderón, Mike James (6)
| Air Canada Centre16,169
| 4–18
|- bgcolor="ffcccc"
| 23
| December 16
| Golden State
| 
| Chris Bosh (27)
| Charlie Villanueva (9)
| José Calderón (11)
| Air Canada Centre15,829
| 4–19
|- bgcolor="ffcccc"
| 24
| December 18
| Philadelphia
| 
| Chris Bosh (22)
| Rafael Araújo, Chris Bosh, Morris Peterson, Charlie Villanueva (7)
| Morris Peterson (4)
| Air Canada Centre18,918
| 4–20
|- bgcolor="bbffbb"
| 25
| December 19
| @ Orlando
| 
| Chris Bosh, Morris Peterson (19)
| Chris Bosh (12)
| Darrick Martin (7)
| TD Waterhouse Centre12,511
| 5–20
|- bgcolor="bbffbb"
| 26
| December 21
| @ Houston
| 
| Mike James (19)
| Chris Bosh (8)
| José Calderón, Morris Peterson (7)
| Toyota Center14,901
| 6–20
|- bgcolor="ffcccc"
| 27
| December 23
| @ San Antonio
| 
| Jalen Rose (19)
| Morris Peterson (11)
| José Calderón (5)
| SBC Center18,797
| 6–21
|- align="center" bgcolor="ffcccc"
| 28
| December 27
| @ Detroit
| 
| Chris Bosh (37)
| Chris Bosh (11)
| Chris Bosh (5)
| The Palace of Auburn Hills22,076
| 6–22
|- align="center" bgcolor="bbffbb"
| 29
| December 28
| Atlanta
| 
| Mike James (28)
| Chris Bosh, Mike James (6)
| Mike James (9)
| Air Canada Centre18,326
| 7–22
|- bgcolor="bbffbb"
| 30
| December 30
| @ Indiana
| 
| Charlie Villanueva (25)
| Chris Bosh (12)
| Mike James (10)
| Conseco Fieldhouse18,345
| 8–22

|- bgcolor="bbffbb"
| 31
| January 3
| @ Atlanta
| 
| Mike James (28)
| Chris Bosh (10)
| Mike James (6)
| Philips Arena10,048
| 9–22
|- bgcolor="bbffbb"
| 32
| January 4
| Orlando
| 
| Charlie Villanueva (24)
| Rafael Araújo (9)
| Mike James (7)
| Air Canada Centre14,085
| 10–22
|- bgcolor="bbffbb"
| 33
| January 6
| Houston
| 
| Mike James (30)
| Chris Bosh (16)
| Mike James (8)
| Air Canada Centre17,460
| 11–22
|- bgcolor="ffcccc"
| 34
| January 8
| New Jersey
| 
| Chris Bosh (27)
| Matt Bonner (8)
| Mike James (7)
| Air Canada Centre18,935
| 11–23
|- bgcolor="ffcccc"
| 35
| January 9
| @ Chicago
| 
| Chris Bosh (26)
| Matt Bonner (9)
| Mike James (13)
| United Center21,103
| 11–24
|- bgcolor="bbffbb"
| 36
| January 11
| Charlotte
| 
| Chris Bosh (29)
| Morris Peterson (11)
| Mike James (7)
| Air Canada Centre14,098
| 12–24
|- bgcolor="bbffbb"
| 37
| January 15
| New York
| 
| Jalen Rose (31)
| Chris Bosh, Charlie Villanueva (6)
| José Calderón (10)
| Air Canada Centre17,393
| 13–24
|- bgcolor="ffcccc"
| 38
| January 17
| @ Utah
| 
| Chris Bosh (27)
| Matt Bonner, Chris Bosh (6)
| José Calderón, Mike James (3)
| Delta Center17,831
| 13–25
|- bgcolor="ffcccc"
| 39
| January 18
| @ Portland
| 
| Jalen Rose (23)
| Chris Bosh (9)
| Mike James (7)
| Rose Garden12,315
| 13–26
|- bgcolor="bbffbb"
| 40
| January 20
| @ Seattle
| 
| Chris Bosh (29)
| Chris Bosh (13)
| Jalen Rose (7)
| KeyArena15,261
| 14–26
|- bgcolor="ffcccc"
| 41
| January 22
| @ L.A. Lakers
| 
| Mike James (26)
| Chris Bosh (8)
| Mike James (10)
| Staples Center18,997
| 14–27
|- bgcolor="ffcccc"
| 42
| January 23
| @ Denver
| 
| Mike James (22)
| Matt Bonner (9)
| Chris Bosh, Mike James (4)
| Pepsi Center14,826
| 14–28
|- bgcolor="ffcccc"
| 43
| January 25
| Chicago
| 
| Chris Bosh (20)
| Chris Bosh (7)
| Mike James (7)
| Air Canada Centre14,198
| 14–29
|- bgcolor="ffcccc"
| 44
| January 27
| @ Milwaukee
| 
| Chris Bosh (21)
| Charlie Villanueva (6)
| José Calderón (7)
| Bradley Center14,867
| 14–30
|- bgcolor="bbffbb"
| 45
| January 29
| Sacramento
| 
| Morris Peterson (23)
| Morris Peterson (10)
| José Calderón (5)
| Air Canada Centre16,573
| 15–30

|- align="center" bgcolor="bbffbb"
| 46
| February 1
| Washington
| 
| Chris Bosh (33)
| Chris Bosh (13)
| Chris Bosh, José Calderón, Mike James, Jalen Rose (4)
| Air Canada Centre13,640
| 16–30
|- bgcolor="bbffbb"
| 47
| February 3
| New York
| 
| Chris Bosh (29)
| Charlie Villanueva (9)
| Mike James (10)
| Air Canada Centre15,858
| 17–30
|- bgcolor="ffcccc"
| 48
| February 5
| L.A. Clippers
| 
| Chris Bosh (29)
| Chris Bosh (16)
| Mike James (7)
| Air Canada Centre15,541
| 17–31
|- bgcolor="ffcccc"
| 49
| February 8
| San Antonio
| 
| Mike James (36)
| Chris Bosh (14)
| Mike James (7)
| Air Canada Centre19,284
| 17–32
|- bgcolor="bbffbb"
| 50
| February 10
| @ Charlotte
| 
| Charlie Villanueva (24)
| Chris Bosh, Morris Peterson (10)
| Mike James (8)
| Charlotte Bobcats Arena17,472
| 18–32
|- bgcolor="bbffbb"
| 51
| February 12
| Portland
| 
| Morris Peterson (22)
| Chris Bosh, Charlie Villanueva (9)
| Mike James (6)
| Air Canada Centre15,014
| 19–32
|- bgcolor="bbffbb"
| 52
| February 13
| @ Minnesota
| 
| Mike James (27)
| José Calderón, Antonio Davis (5)
| Mike James (6)
| Target Center14,911
| 20–32
|- bgcolor="ffcccc"
| 53
| February 15
| @ New York
| 
| Chris Bosh (25)
| Chris Bosh, Morris Peterson (7)
| Mike James (9)
| Madison Square Garden18,901
| 20–33
|- bgcolor="ffcccc"
| 54
| February 21
| @ Memphis
| 
| Chris Bosh (26)
| Charlie Villanueva (10)
| José Calderón (7)
| FedExForum15,385
| 20–34
|- bgcolor="ffcccc"
| 55
| February 25
| @ Dallas
| 
| Chris Bosh (29)
| Chris Bosh (13)
| Mike James (7)
| American Airlines Center19,791
| 20–35
|- bgcolor="ffcccc"
| 56
| February 27
| @ Miami
| 
| Mike James (26)
| Charlie Villanueva (11)
| Chris Bosh, José Calderón, Antonio Davis, Mike James, Morris Peterson (3)
| American Airlines Arena19,600
| 20–36

|- align="center" bgcolor="ffcccc"
| 57
| March 1
| Atlanta
| 
| Chris Bosh (27)
| Charlie Villanueva (11)
| Chris Bosh (5)
| Air Canada Centre15,137
| 20–37
|- bgcolor="ffcccc"
| 58
| March 4
| @ New Jersey
| 
| Morris Peterson (25)
| Chris Bosh, Charlie Villanueva (11)
| Mike James (7)
| Continental Airlines Arena16,215
| 20–38
|- bgcolor="bbffbb"
| 59
| March 5
| Boston
| 
| Morris Peterson (27)
| Chris Bosh (10)
| Mike James (6)
| Air Canada Centre16,623
| 21–38
|- bgcolor="ffcccc"
| 60
| March 7
| @ Cleveland
| 
| Mike James (31)
| Charlie Villanueva (11)
| Mike James (8)
| Quicken Loans Arena18,077
| 21–39
|- bgcolor="ffcccc"
| 61
| March 8
| Cleveland
| 
| Morris Peterson (31)
| Chris Bosh (14)
| Mike James (7)
| Air Canada Centre19,800
| 21–40
|- bgcolor="ffcccc"
| 62
| March 10
| Denver
| 
| Mike James (26)
| Chris Bosh (15)
| José Calderón (5)
| Air Canada Centre17,806
| 21–41
|- bgcolor="bbffbb"
| 63
| March 12
| Indiana
| 
| Morris Peterson (25)
| Chris Bosh (8)
| Mike James (4)
| Air Canada Centre17,573
| 22–41
|- bgcolor="bbffbb"
| 64
| March 14
| @ Philadelphia
| 
| Chris Bosh (31)
| Charlie Villanueva (10)
| Darrick Martin (12)
| Wachovia Center14,917
| 23–41
|- bgcolor="ffcccc"
| 65
| March 15
| Detroit
| 
| Mike James (24)
| Chris Bosh (11)
| Mike James (11)
| Air Canada Centre19,800
| 23–42
|- bgcolor="bbffbb"
| 66
| March 17
| Milwaukee
| 
| Chris Bosh (27)
| Chris Bosh (10)
| Mike James (6)
| Air Canada Centre17,273
| 24–42
|- bgcolor="bbffbb"
| 67
| March 21
| @ New York
| 
| Mike James (37)
| Mike James, Charlie Villanueva (8)
| Mike James (5)
| Madison Square Garden18,131
| 25–42
|- bgcolor="ffcccc"
| 68
| March 22
| @ Boston
| 
| Mike James (31)
| Chris Bosh (11)
| Chris Bosh (8)
| TD Banknorth Garden18,624
| 25–43
|- bgcolor="bbffbb"
| 69
| March 24
| Minnesota
| 
| Morris Peterson (21)
| Chris Bosh (15)
| Mike James (5)
| Air Canada Centre17,493
| 26–43
|- bgcolor="ffcccc"
| 70
| March 26
| @ Milwaukee
| 
| Charlie Villanueva (48)
| Charlie Villanueva (9)
| Mike James (10)
| Bradley Center16,317
| 26–44
|- bgcolor="ffcccc"
| 71
| March 29
| Miami
| 
| Morris Peterson (28)
| Charlie Villanueva (13)
| Mike James (12)
| Air Canada Centre19,973
| 26–45
|- bgcolor="ffcccc"
| 72
| March 31
| Phoenix
| 
| Morris Peterson (38)
| Pape Sow (15)
| Mike James (10)
| Air Canada Centre19,800
| 26–46

|- align="center" bgcolor="ffcccc"
| 73
| April 2
| New Orleans/Oklahoma City
| 
| Morris Peterson (27)
| Charlie Villanueva (18)
| Mike James (10)
| Air Canada Centre15,079
| 26–47
|- bgcolor="ffcccc"
| 74
| April 4
| Boston
| 
| Morris Peterson (32)
| Matt Bonner (13)
| Andre Barrett, Morris Peterson (6)
| Air Canada Centre16,598
| 26–48
|- bgcolor="ffcccc"
| 75
| April 5
| @ Indiana
| 
| Mike James (34)
| Mike James, Charlie Villanueva (11)
| Mike James (8)
| Conseco Fieldhouse14,037
| 26–49
|- bgcolor="ffcccc"
| 76
| April 7
| @ New Orleans/Oklahoma City
| 
| Mike James (36)
| Loren Woods (10)
| Mike James (4)
| Ford Center18,854
| 26–50
|- bgcolor="ffcccc"
| 77
| April 9
| Charlotte
| 
| Mike James (32)
| Joey Graham (9)
| Mike James (10)
| Air Canada Centre17,679
| 26–51
|- bgcolor="ffcccc"
| 78
| April 11
| @ Miami
| 
| Mike James (32)
| Darrick Martin, Charlie Villanueva (5)
| Mike James (6)
| American Airlines Arena19,600
| 26–52
|- bgcolor="ffcccc"
| 79
| April 12
| @ Orlando
| 
| Morris Peterson (23)
| Morris Peterson (8)
| Mike James, Morris Peterson (5)
| TD Waterhouse Centre15,009
| 26–53
|- bgcolor="bbffbb"
| 80
| April 14
| Detroit
| 
| Mike James (39)
| Loren Woods (11)
| José Calderón (9)
| Air Canada Centre19,800
| 27–53
|- bgcolor="ffcccc"
| 81
| April 17
| Indiana
| 
| Morris Peterson (27)
| Loren Woods (14)
| José Calderón (8)
| Air Canada Centre18,267
| 27–54
|- bgcolor="ffcccc"
| 82
| April 19
| @ Chicago
| 
| Morris Peterson, Charlie Villanueva (29)
| Charlie Villanueva (10)
| José Calderón (5)
| United Center20,364
| 27–55

Player statistics

Regular season

* Statistics include only games with the Raptors

Award winners
 Chris Bosh, NBA All-Star Game Appearance
 Charlie Villanueva, NBA All-Star Rookie-Sophomore Game Appearance (Rookie)
 Charlie Villanueva, NBA All-NBA Rookie First Team

References

External links
 
 

Toronto Raptors seasons
Toronto
Tor